Andrew Henry Plaks (born 1945) is an American sinologist who specializes in the study of the vernacular fiction of the Ming and Qing dynasties. From 1973 to 2007 he taught at Princeton University, becoming full professor in 1980. He moved to the Hebrew University of Jerusalem in 2007, where he became Professor of East Asian Studies.

In 1968 he married Livia Basch (1947–2013), and they had two sons, Jason and Eric.

Academic career
Plaks studied as an undergraduate in the Department of Oriental Studies at Princeton University, graduating summa cum laude with an A.B. in 1967. He stayed on at Princeton University for graduate study in East Asian Studies. He obtained his Ph.D. in 1973 with a dissertation on Archetype and allegory in the Hung-Lou Meng. He was subsequently offered a position in the Department of East Asian Studies at Princeton University, becoming an associate professor in 1976, and a full professor in 1980.  In 2007 he retired from Princeton University, and moved to Israel to take up a position at the Hebrew University of Jerusalem, where he became Professor of East Asian Studies.

Contributions to the field
Plaks' 1987 book Four Masterworks of the Ming Novel, which won the Joseph Levenson Book Prize is an analysis of a group of Ming dynasty novels which Plaks argues changed the genre: Romance of the Three Kingdoms, Water Margin, Jin Ping Mei, and Journey to the West.  Ellen Widmer, writing in the Journal of Asian Studies, says that the book creates "a far-reaching hypothesis about the consolidation of the novel form in China", namely that the four novels can be taken as a milestone. He identifies a "figural density" and establishes that the key to understanding the novels is the use of irony, by which he means "every possible disjunction between what is said and what is meant". According to Plaks the novels ask serious questions about sexuality, selfhood, heroism, power, reality, and they offer serious Neo-Confucian answers.

Another literary scholar, Paul Ropp, says that Plaks pays special attention to the 16th century editors, authors, and commentators who played different roles than those in earlier times. He also points out structural differences, such as their "paradigmatic length of one-hundred chapters [with one exception], narrative rhythms based on division into ten-chapter units, further subdivisions into building blocks of three- or four chapter episodes, contrived symmetries between the first and second halves of the texts, special exploitation of opening and closing sections, as well as certain other schemes of spatial and temporal ordering, notably the plotting of events on seasonal or geographical grids". Ropp says that although not everybody may agree with all of Plaks' ideas, he has pioneered the sophisticated criticism of the traditional Chinese novel, and his emphasis on the use of irony in the novels is especially important.

In 2018, the first volume of Dream of the Red Chamber, covering chapters 1-27, was published in Hebrew, translated jointly by Plaks and Amira Katz. This is the first translation of the novel into the Hebrew language.

Bibliography
  
 
 
 
 
 
  (translation of The Four Masterworks)

References

External links 

 Andrew Plaks  at the Hebrew University of Jerusalem

American sinologists
Princeton University alumni
Princeton University faculty
1945 births
Living people
Academic staff of the Hebrew University of Jerusalem